Jerome Alvon Mathis (born July 26, 1983) is a former American and Canadian football wide receiver and kick returner. He was drafted by the Houston Texans in the fourth round of the 2005 NFL Draft, He earned a Pro Bowl selection and was an All-Pro with the Texans in 2005.

Early years
Mathis attended Petersburg High School in Petersburg, where he was an all-state, all-district and all-metro wide receiver and kick returner.

Track and field
Mathis left high school as a six time state champion in track, winning the 2001 national indoor 200 meter title, and setting the 7th fastest time in the nation with 21.79 seconds, at the Nike Classic. He also set the joint 5th fastest 55 metres time in the nation that year with 6.29 seconds, faster than Tyson Gay, and the 2nd fastest 300 meter indoor time with 34.03 seconds.

Mathis also competed in the long jump, posting a personal best of 7.50 meters at Landover, Maryland in 2003.

Personal bests

College career
Mathis holds the NCAA record for career kick return average, breaking the record set by John Taylor of Delaware State University, with an average of 26.6 yards per return.  He also holds the NCAA record for career kickoff returns for a touchdown with six.

Professional career

2005 NFL Combine
Mathis recorded the third fastest, 40 time (4.26 seconds) ever at the NFL Combine, which was broken by Chris Johnson in 2008 and John Ross in 2017. His time was tied by Dri Archer in 2014.

Houston Texans
In his rookie season with the Texans, he was selected to the Pro Bowl for the AFC to be their starter as a kick returner.  He was one of three rookies (Shawne Merriman, linebacker, of the San Diego Chargers and Lofa Tatupu, linebacker, of the Seattle Seahawks, being the others) selected to be participants in the game.

Mathis fractured his left foot in January 2006 during the Pro Bowl, but it wasn't discovered until OTA's months later. He was expected to miss only four months, but instead missed six months.  He returned to practice in November 2006 after missing the first nine games of the season.  He was later placed on Injured Reserve.  Mathis then played in only three games in 2007 even returning one kick for a touchdown before once again being place on Injured Reserve.

Mathis was a restricted free agent following the 2007 season; the Texans declined to offer him another contract.

Washington Redskins
On April 4, 2008, Mathis was signed by the Washington Redskins.  He was waived by the team on May 15.

Toronto Argonauts
Mathis signed with the Toronto Argonauts of the Canadian Football League on May 11, 2009, and was hoped to replace the loss of Dominique Dorsey to the NFL as kick returner on special teams but was hampered by injuries and cut at the end of training camp. He was re-signed on September 17. On November 6, 2009, Mathis was released by the Argonauts.

Pittsburgh Power
Mathis signed with the Pittsburgh Power of the Arena Football League on January 4, 2011. Mathis had a career game on June 11, 2011 against the Tampa Bay Storm, setting new Power single-game franchise records for yards receiving (195), longest reception (46 yards), and longest kick return (57 yards). He also tied Mike Washington's single-game franchise record with 12 receptions and had the first kick return touchdown in Power history. Mathis played in 9 games for the Power, catching 30 passes for 418 yards and 7 touchdowns. He also returned 31 kickoffs for 688 yards and 1 touchdown.

Career statistics

Legal troubles
In December 2007, Mathis was issued a misdemeanor citation for loose dogs after his neighbors complained that they were harassed by his escaped pit bulls.  Mathis, allowed the dogs to remain loose and kept unvaccinated animals.  Officers captured one dog and three puppies near Mathis' Manvel home.  No injuries were reported.

Mathis was arrested on February 19, 2008 following a domestic violence incident, but the charges were dropped.

References

External links
Just Sports Stats
Houston Texans bio
Toronto Argonauts bio

1983 births
Living people
Sportspeople from Petersburg, Virginia
American players of Canadian football
Canadian football wide receivers
American football wide receivers
American football return specialists
American Conference Pro Bowl players
Hampton Pirates football players
Houston Texans players
Washington Redskins players
Toronto Argonauts players
African-American players of Canadian football
Hartford Colonials players
Pittsburgh Power players
21st-century African-American sportspeople
20th-century African-American people